The Vananchal Express is an Express train belonging to Eastern Railway zone that runs between  and  in India. It is currently being operated with 13403/13404 train numbers on a daily basis. this train is also remembered for the famous Sainthia train collision.

Service

The 13403/Vananchal Express was inaugurated on 15 July 2000. It has an average speed of 39 km/hr and covers 553 km in 14h 15m. The  13404/Vananchal Express has an average speed of 41 km/hr and covers 556 km in 13h 30m.

Route & Halts 

The important halts of the train are:

Coach composition

The train has standard swanky ICF rakes upgraded under Utkristh Scheme with max speed of 110 kmph. The train consists of 14 coaches :

 1 AC II Tier
 1 AC III Tier
 5 Sleeper coaches
 5 General
 2 Seating cum Luggage Rake

Traction

Both trains are hauled by an Asansol-based WAP-4 electric locomotive from Ranchi to Andal. From Andal it is hauled by a Jamalpur-based WDM-3A diesel locomotive until Bhagalpur and vice versa.

Direction reversal

The train reverses its direction 1 times:

See also 

 Ranchi Junction railway station
 Bhagalpur Junction railway station
 Sainthia train collision

Notes

External links 

 13403/Vananchal Express
 13404/Vananchal Express

References 

Transport in Ranchi
Transport in Bhagalpur
Named passenger trains of India
Rail transport in Jharkhand
Rail transport in Bihar
Rail transport in West Bengal
Express trains in India